Nathan Libby is an American Democratic politician from Maine. He represents Senate District 21, which serves Lewiston, Maine's second-largest city. Libby grew up in central Maine and attended Bates College where he majored in history and economics. He also holds a Master of Business Administration from the University of Southern Maine and works as an economic development consultant, currently as the president of Community Concepts Finance Corporation. Libby served one term in the Maine House of Representatives from 2012 to 2014 and was first elected to the Maine Senate in 2014. He served as the Senate majority leader from 2018-2020.

Early life and education
Libby grew up outside of Waterville, Maine and attended Skowhegan Area High School, graduating in 2003. He received a need-based scholarship to Bates College, where he completed a Bachelor of Arts in history and economics in 2007. He was the first in his family to attend college. In 2020, Libby received a Master of Business Administration from the University of Southern Maine.

Political career
Libby served on the Lewiston city council from 2011-2015 and has chaired Lewiston’s Universally Accessible Playground committee since 2016. He was elected to the Maine House of Representatives in 2012 and represented District 73 (now District 60) for two years.

On Friday, February 14, 2014, Libby announced he would seek the District 21 Senate seat held by Margaret Craven, who had just announced she would not seek re-election. In November 2014, he beat Republican Patti Gagne by less than 100 votes.

Libby ran unopposed in the 2016 Democratic primary, the 2016 general election and the 2018 Democratic primary. In the 2018 general election, he beat Republican Nelson Peters Jr. 60%-40%, and his Democratic peers unanimously elected him Senate majority leader.

November 2020, Libby was again selected as Senate majority leader. In early 2021, citing increasing professional and family obligations, Libby resigned his leadership position but remained in the District 21 seat..

Libby has served on the Government Oversight Committee, the Taxation Committee and the State and Local Government Committee.

In July 2021, after Lewiston City Councilor Safiya Khalid alleged racism at a meeting of the Lewiston Democratic Party, Libby dismissed her complaints and suggested Khalid's opponents were not racist.

Personal life
Libby and his wife Andrea, a registered nurse, and their two sons live in Lewiston. Libby enjoys carpentry, gardening, landscaping, and outdoor excursions with his family. He works as an economic development consultant, and in December 2020 was named president of Community Concepts Finance Corporation.

Awards & honors
2015 Homecare and Hospice Alliance of Maine Advocate of the Year award
2016 Young Professionals of Lewiston and Auburn Civic Leader award
2017 Uplift LA Local Hero award
2017 American Legion of Maine Legislator of the Year award
2018 Maine Academy of Nutritionists and Dietetics Public Policy Leadership award
2019 Maine Education Association “Friend of Education” award
2019 Maine Real Estate Development Association Public Policy award

Electoral history

References

External links
Senator Nate Libby on Facebook
Maine State Legislature: Sen. Nathan Libby (D - Androscoggin)
Nate Libby on Twitter
Nate Libby on Instagram
"Lies and intolerance the root of D.C. attack" Twin City Times guest column, 16 January 2021

21st-century American politicians
Living people
Bates College alumni
Lewiston, Maine City Council members
Majority leaders of the Maine Senate
Democratic Party members of the Maine House of Representatives
Year of birth missing (living people)